Beyond the Notes Live is a live album from Jon Lord, recorded on October 5, 2004 at Vulkanhalle, Cologne, Germany. It features performances by Frida Lyngstad, Sam Brown, Miller Anderson and The Trondheim Soloists. The concert was released on DVD in the Fall of 2004 by EMI.

Track listing
 "Sunrise / Pictured Within" - vocal: Miller Anderson
 "Sarabande"
 "I'll Send You A Postcard"
 "Cologne Again"
 "Pavane"
 "Gigue"
 "A Smile When I Shook His Hand" / "Here Comes The Sun"
 "One From The Meadow" - vocal: Sam Brown
 "Unsquare Dance"
 "November Calls" - vocal: Miller Anderson
 "The Telemann Experiment"
 "The Sun Will Shine Again" - vocal: Frida
 "De Profundis"
 "Bouree"
Total running time: 130 minutes
Bonus features
 Interview with Jon Lord
 Beyond the scenes
 Biography
 Discography
Total running time: 25 minutes

Personnel
Jon Lord - piano, Hammond organ
 - percussion, guitar, vocals
Urs Fuchs - bass guitar
Paul Shigihara - guitars
Matthias Krauss - keyboards
Bert Smaak - drums
Susanne Heitmann - flute, clarinet
Sabine Van Baaren - vocals, percussion
Emilia Amper - keyed fiddle
Miller Anderson - vocals
Frida - vocals
Sam Brown - vocals
The Trondheim Soloists

Production notes
Produced by Jon Lord and Georg Bergheim
Music mixed by Peter Brandt and Mario Argandoña
Video director - Sven Offen

Jon Lord albums
2004 live albums
2004 video albums
Live video albums
EMI Records live albums
EMI Records video albums